The University of Arizona Campus Historic District is a historic district listed on the National Register of Historic Places in Tucson, Arizona. It consists of the historic core of the University of Arizona and is roughly bounded by East Second Street, North Cherry Avenue, E. Fourth Street, and Park Avenue. The district was created on June 13, 1986.

Description
The historic district consists of 18 contributing buildings, two of which (Old Main and the University Library) had been listed on the National Register prior to the creation of the district. The buildings are in various early 20th century revivalist styles. There are also several contributing elements that are not buildings.

All 18 buildings are constructed of red brick, with high qualities of workmanship. Red brick would remain a constant for new UA campus buildings for decades, creating a cohesive material for the campus.

Many buildings had been modified to add fire escapes and to improve accessibility; the original National Register nomination characterizes these changes as "intrusive".

Contributing properties

Non-contributing properties
Five properties in the district were constructed after 1938 and are not part of the historic district:
Chemistry Building addition (1948)
Social Sciences Building (1950)
Economics and Business Administration (1952)
Anthropology (addition to Arizona State Museum, 1961)
Additions to the library (1951, 1963)

References

External links

Historic districts on the National Register of Historic Places in Arizona
Historic district contributing properties in Arizona
National Register of Historic Places in Tucson, Arizona
University and college buildings on the National Register of Historic Places in Arizona
Neoclassical architecture in Arizona
Romanesque Revival architecture in Arizona